Lawrence Nomanyakpon Anini (c. 1960 – March 29, 1987)   was a Nigerian bandit who terrorised Benin City in the 1980s along with his sidekick Monday Osunbor. He was captured and executed for his crimes.

Arrest
On December 3, 1986, he was caught at a house in Benin City between 2nd and 3rd East Circular Road in the company of a girlfriend. His girlfriend was said to have betrayed him. Anini was shot in the leg, transferred to a military hospital. Several days after he was shot in the leg, one of his legs was amputated. The country's military leader, Ibrahim Babangida, demanded a speedy trial. Anini was convicted of most of his charges and was executed on March 29, 1987.

References

1960s births
1987 deaths
Benin City
People executed for murder
Bank robbers
Nigerian gangsters
Nigerian people convicted of murder
People convicted of murder by Nigeria
20th-century executions by Nigeria
Executed Nigerian people
People from Edo State
Executed gangsters
1986 murders in Nigeria